Bairbre de Brún (born 10 January 1954) is an Irish politician and former Member of the European Parliament (MEP) for Northern Ireland.

Political work 
Born in Terenure, Dublin on 10 January 1954, de Brún began her political career as a member of the National Committee Against the H-Blocks & Armagh Gaol in the late 1970s and early 1980s, focusing heavily on the treatment of women in Armagh Gaol. De Brún became an early member of Sinn Féin's Ard Chomhairle and in 1998 became an MLA in the Northern Ireland Assembly, representing West Belfast. She was Minister of Health, Social Services and Public Safety.

By profession, de Brún was a teacher and taught in the Irish-medium education sector in west Belfast. She was also a French and German teacher and is noted for her devotion to the Irish language. She has lived in the Andersonstown area of Belfast since the early 1980s. She is a fluent Irish speaker and an expert in human rights and equality issues. De Brún is also a member of the Sinn Féin negotiating team and travelled internationally on numerous occasions to promote the Irish peace process.

She was a member of the Environment and Petitions Committee in the European Parliament and a substitute member of the Regional Development Committee. Following the 2004 Euro elections she was one of two Sinn Féin MEPs and the first Sinn Féin politician to represent Northern Ireland in the European Parliament. She sat with the European United Left - Nordic Green Left.  She topped the poll in the Northern Ireland constituency of the European Parliament in the 2009 European elections, a first for a nationalist or republican party.

She has also been a strong supporter of the Irish language and its use globally, and was one of the only MEPs to use Irish as her primary language, rarely making speeches within the parliament in English.

De Brún was a member of the Regional Policy Committee in the European Parliament and a substitute member of the Environment Committee. Within the EU parliament she focused on environmental issues. She was part of an EU delegation that attended the 2011 Durban Climate Change Conference. She was critical of the final report of the conference saying "We need to recognise that even the best possible outcome from Durban still only takes us half way down the road we need to travel".

She resigned from the European Parliament in May 2012 for "personal reasons" although it was reported that she intended on remaining active within the party. She was succeeded by Martina Anderson, an MLA for Foyle.

References

External links
 Official Sinn Féin biography
 European Parliament profile
Maiden Speech : European Parliament – 21 July 2004

1954 births
Living people
Northern Ireland MLAs 1998–2003
Northern Ireland MLAs 2003–2007
Ministers of the Northern Ireland Executive (since 1999)
Sinn Féin MLAs
Politicians from Dublin (city)
Women in The Troubles (Northern Ireland)
21st-century women MEPs for Northern Ireland
Female members of the Northern Ireland Assembly
Sinn Féin MEPs
MEPs for Northern Ireland 2004–2009
MEPs for Northern Ireland 2009–2014
Women ministers of the Northern Ireland Executive
20th-century women politicians from Northern Ireland
21st-century women politicians from Northern Ireland